William Conrad Gloth (August 7, 1886 – December 3, 1944) was an American football player and coach. Gloth was a center on Virginia Cavaliers football teams of the University of Virginia, noted for his ability to beat the ends downfield on a punt.

Early life
William Conrad "Bily" Gloth was born on August 7, 1886, in Erie, Pennsylvania.

Sports career
Gloth was selected for the All-Southern team of "a well-known New York authority on sports" in 1907. He played center on Virginia Cavaliers football at the University of Virginia. He was the ninth head football coach at the Virginia Military Institute (VMI) in Lexington, Virginia, serving for two seasons, from 1909 to 1910, and compiling a record of 7–6–1.

Head coaching record

Legal career
After leaving VMI, Gloth moved to Arlington County, Virginia. He was elected police court judge in 1916. In 1924, Gloth was elected commonwealth's attorney for Arlington County and he served in that role for years.

Personal life
Gloth had one son, Ensign William Gloth Jr.

Gloth died on December 3, 1944, at Georgetown University Hospital in Washington, D.C. He was interred at Columbia Gardens Cemetery.

References

External links
 

1886 births
1944 deaths
Sportspeople from Erie, Pennsylvania
Virginia Cavaliers football players
VMI Keydets football coaches
American football centers
All-Southern college football players
County and city Commonwealth's Attorneys in Virginia